Hong Soo-hyun (born February 15, 1981) is a South Korean actress. She is best known for her roles in Dae Jo Yeong, The Princess' Man, and Goodbye Dear Wife.

Career 
After she debuted as a magazine model in high school, Hong appeared in a Johnson & Johnson commercial in 1996, and began her acting career in 1999. In the following decade, true stardom remained elusive as she mostly found herself restricted to supporting roles. Then Hong received strong reviews for her back-to-back strong performances in the 2011 period drama The Princess' Man as a role Princess Kyunghye, and the 2012 quirky comedy History of a Salaryman, as well as Goodbye Dear Wife (2012).

Personal life 
On May 28, 2021, Hong married her non-celebrity boyfriend in a private wedding ceremony.

Philanthropy 
On August 9, 2022, Hong donated  to help those affected by the 2022 South Korean floods through the Hope Bridge Korea Disaster Relief Association.

Filmography

Film

Television series

Variety show

Music video appearances

Theater

Discography

Awards and nominations

References

External links 
 
 
 

1981 births
Living people
South Korean television actresses
South Korean film actresses
South Korean women singers
South Korean musical theatre actresses
20th-century South Korean actresses
21st-century South Korean actresses
South Korean Christians
Dongduk Women's University alumni